John Bole may refer to:

John Bole (MP) (fl. 1407–10), MP for Shaftesbury
 John Bole (archbishop), Roman Catholic Archbishop of Armagh (15th century)
 John A. Bole (1906–1943), U.S. World War II submariner

See also
 John Boles (disambiguation)